RFA Sir Geraint (L3027) was a Landing Ship Logistic of the Round Table class. She saw service in the Falklands War and Sierra Leone.

Background
The ship was originally built for army service, and was taken over by the Royal Fleet Auxiliary in 1970. Round Table class ships were exclusively manned by Hong Kong Chinese sailors from their introduction in 1963 until 1989, when Sir Lancelot was the last RFA to be crewed in this way. Like all of her class, Sir Geraint was named after a Knight of the Round Table.

She was commissioned in 1967 and saw extensive service in many of Britain's naval operations since. Her home port was Marchwood.

Operational history

Falklands War
Sir Geraint first saw combat in the Falklands War of 1982, when along with all of the Royal Navy's other amphibious ships, she was sent to recapture the Falkland Islands from an Argentine occupation force. At the start of the war, the ship was at Devonport and after the embarkation of 450 Royal Marines and 3 Gazelle helicopters, she left for Ascension Island. The ship anchored in San Carlos Water, Fitzroy Sound and Teal Inlet, discharging fuel and cargo.

1978-2003
In Operation Palliser, the ship was sent to Sierra Leone in 2000 when the U.K. intervened there.
11 September 1978 the Sir Geraint sailed from Alexandra dock, Liverpool en route to Belfast, carrying  13 platoon, Somme company, 1st Battalion Kings Own Royal Border Regiment; a detachment from the RAF and another detachment (unit not disclosed).

Decommissioning
Sir Geraint was listed for disposal in May 2003 and was reported broken up in India in December 2005.

References

Raymond Blackman, Ships of the Royal Navy (Macdonald and Jane's, London, 1973)

Geraint (L3027)
Ships built on the River Clyde
1967 ships
Falklands War naval ships of the United Kingdom